The pallasites are a class of stony–iron meteorite.

Structure and composition
It consists of centimetre-sized olivine crystals of peridot quality in an iron-nickel matrix. Coarser metal areas develop Widmanstätten patterns upon etching. Minor constituents are schreibersite, troilite, chromite, pyroxenes, and phosphates (whitlockite, stanfieldite, farringtonite, and merrillite).

Classification and subgroups

Using the oxygen isotopic composition, meteoric iron composition and silicate composition pallasites are divided into 4 subgroups:
 Main group pallasites (PMG): Almost all pallasites
 Eagle Station group (PES): 5 specimens known. They are related to IIF irons.
 Pyroxene Pallasite grouplet (PPX): Counts only Vermillion and Yamato 8451. They take their name from the high orthopyroxene content (about 5%). Metal matrix shows a fine octahedrite Widmanstätten pattern.
 Pallasite ungrouped (P-ung): Specimens that don't fit into any groups or grouplets

Origin
Pallasites were once thought to originate at the core-mantle boundary of differentiated asteroids that were subsequently shattered through impacts. An alternative recent hypothesis is that they are impact-generated mixtures of core and mantle materials.

History

The Krasnoyarsk mass described by Pallas in 1776 was one of the examples used by E.F.F. Chladni in the 1790s to demonstrate the reality of meteorite falls on the Earth, which most scientists at his time considered as fairytales. This rock mass was dissimilar to all rocks or ores found in this area (and the large piece could not have been accidentally transported to the find site), but its content of native metal was similar to other finds known from completely different areas.

Pallasite falls
Pallasites are a rare type of meteorite. Only 61 are known to date, including 10 from Antarctica, with four being observed falls. The following four falls are in chronological order:
Mineo, Sicily, Italy. A luminous meteor was observed and an object seen to fall with a loud roar in May 1826. Only  are preserved in collections.
Zaisho, Japan. 330 g were found on February 1, 1898, after the appearance of a fireball.
Marjalahti, Karelia, Russia. At this date the fall site belonged to Finland, and the main mass of Marjalahti is now at the Geological Museum of the University of Helsinki.
Omolon, Magadan Region, Russia. A reindeer-breeder observed the fall on May 16, 1981, and found the  meteorite two years later. The fall was confirmed by a meteorological station that had observed a fireball on the same date.

Notable pallasite finds 

Although pallasites are a rare meteorite type, enough pallasite material is found in museums and meteorite collections and is available for research.  This is due to several large finds, some of which yielded more than a metric ton. The following are the largest finds:
Brenham, Kansas, United States. In 1890 the find of about 20 masses with a total weight of  around the shallow Haviland Crater were reported.
Huckitta, Northern Territory, Australia. Earlier, in 1924, a transported piece of about  had been found on Burt Plain north of Alice Springs.
Fukang, Xinjiang Province, China.
Imilac, Atacama Desert, Chile; known since 1822.
Brahin, Gomel Region, Belarus, known since 1810. Many masses were found strewn in a field, with a total weight of about 820 kg.
Esquel, Chubut, Argentina. A large mass of 755 kg was found embedded in soil before 1951.
Pallasovka, Pallasovka, Russia.  A single mass of 198 kg was found near Pallasovka, Russia in 1990.  Coincidentally, both the town of Pallasovka and pallasite meteorites were named after the naturalist, Peter Pallas.
Krasnojarsk, Yeniseisk, Russia. It was seen by P. S. Pallas in 1772 and transported to Krasnojarsk (see above). The main mass of 515 kg is now in Moscow at the Academy of Sciences. Pallasites are named after Peter Pallas for his study of this meteorite.
 Seymchan, discovered near the town by the same name, in far eastern Russia in 1967. This main group Pallasite has some areas free of olivine crystals, and may have formed near the junction of the core and the mantle of an asteroid. Multiple masses in excess of 1 tonne have been recovered.

Notes

References

See also
 Glossary of meteoritics
 Port Orford meteorite hoax

External links 

Pallasite images from Meteorites Australia - Meteorites.com.au
Legend of Glorieta Mountain Discovery of a large pallasite in New Mexico